Sherwood Forest is a royal forest in Nottinghamshire, England, famous because of its historic association with the legend of Robin Hood.

The area has been wooded since the end of the Last Glacial Period (as attested by pollen sampling cores). Today Sherwood Forest National Nature Reserve encompasses , surrounding the village of Edwinstowe, the site of Thoresby Hall. It is a remnant of an older and much larger royal hunting forest, which derived its name from its status as the shire  (or sher) wood of Nottinghamshire, which extended into several neighbouring counties (shires), bordered on the west by the River Erewash and the Forest of East Derbyshire. When Domesday Book was compiled in 1086 the forest covered perhaps a quarter of Nottinghamshire (approximately 19,000 acres or 7,800 hectares) in woodland and heath subject to the forest laws.

The forest gives its name to the Sherwood Parliamentary constituency.

Geology 
Sherwood Forest is established over an area underlain by the Permian and Triassic age New Red Sandstone. The larger part of the Forest is found across the outcrop of pebbly sandstones known as the Chester Formation. The regional dip is a gentle one to the east, hence younger rocks are found in that direction and older ones exposed to the west. The local stratigraphy is (uppermost/youngest at top):

Mercia Mudstone Group
Tarporley Siltstone Formation (siltstones, mudstones and sandstones)
including Retford Member (mudstones)
Sherwood Sandstone Group
Chester Formation (pebbly sandstones)
Lenton Sandstone Formation
Edlington Formation (mudstones and sandstones)

The sandstone is an aquifer providing a local water supply. Quaternary deposits include river sands and gravels, river terrace deposits and some scattered mid-Pleistocene glacial till. There are 41 local geodiversity sites within the Sherwood NCA; these are largely quarries and river sections.

Management and conservation

The Sherwood Forest Trust is a small charity that covers the ancient royal boundary and current national character area of Sherwood Forest. Its aims are based on conservation, heritage and communities but also include tourism and the economy.

Nottinghamshire County Council and Forestry England jointly manage the ancient remnant of forest north of the village of Edwinstowe, providing walks, footpaths and a host of other activities.

This central core of ancient Sherwood is a Site of Special Scientific Interest (SSSI), NNR and Special Area of Conservation (SAC). It is a very important site for ancient oaks, wood pasture, invertebrates and fungi, as well as being linked to the legends of Robin Hood.

During the Second World War parts of Sherwood Forest were used extensively by the military for ammunition stores, POW camps and training areas. Oil was produced at Eakring. After the war large ammunition dumps were abandoned in the forest and were not cleared until 1952, with at least 46,000 tons of ammunition in them.

Part of the forest was opened to the public as a country park in 1969 by Nottinghamshire County Council, which manages a small part of the forest under lease from the Thoresby Estate. In 2002 a portion of Sherwood Forest was designated a national nature reserve by English Nature.

A new Sherwood Forest Visitor Centre was authorised in 2015. In August 2018 the RSPB opened the new development with a shop and café, having been granted permission to manage the woods in 2015. Part of an agreement with Natural England was that the land where the existing 1970s visitor centre was located would be restored to wood pasture.

Some portions of the forest retain many very old oaks, especially in the portion known as the Dukeries, south of the town of Worksop, which was so called because it used to contain five ducal residences.

The River Idle, a tributary of the Trent, is formed in Sherwood Forest from the confluence of several minor streams.

Tourism

Sherwood attracts around 350,000 tourists annually, many from other countries. Each August the nature reserve hosts a week-long Robin Hood Festival. This event recreates a medieval atmosphere and features the major characters from the Robin Hood legend. The week's entertainment includes jousters and strolling players dressed in medieval attire, in addition to a medieval encampment complete with jesters, musicians, rat-catchers, alchemists and fire eaters.

Throughout the year visitors are attracted to the Sherwood Forest Art and Craft Centre in the former coach house and stables of Edwinstowe Hall in the heart of the Forest. The centre contains art studios and a cafe and hosts special events, including craft demonstrations and exhibitions.

Major Oak

Sherwood Forest is home to the famous Major Oak, which according to local folklore was Robin Hood's principal hideout. The oak tree is between 800 and 1,000 years old and since the Victorian era its massive limbs have been partially supported by an elaborate system of scaffolding. In February 1998 a local company took cuttings from the Major Oak and began cultivating clones of the famous tree with the intention of sending saplings to be planted in major cities around the world.

The Major Oak was featured on the 2005 BBC TV programme Seven Natural Wonders as one of the natural wonders of the Midlands.

Thynghowe

Thynghowe, an important Danelaw meeting place where people came to resolve disputes and settle issues, was lost to history until its rediscovery in 2005–06 by local history enthusiasts amidst the old oaks of an area known as the Birklands. Experts believe it may also yield clues about the boundary of the ancient Anglo Saxon kingdoms of Mercia and Northumbria.

English Heritage inspected the site, confirming that it was known as ‘Thynghowe’ in 1334 and 1609.

See also
List of forests in the United Kingdom
List of ancient woods in England
Sherwood Foresters, a British Army regiment associated with Nottinghamshire

References

Further reading
Bankes,  Richard. Sherwood Forest in 1609: A Crown Survey (Thoroton Society record series)
Conduit,  Brian. Exploring Sherwood Forest
Fletcher, John. Ornament of Sherwood Forest From Ducal Estate to Public Park
Gray, Adrian. Sherwood Forest and the Dukeries (Phillimore) 2008
Sherwood Forest and the East Midlands Walks (Jarrold Pathfinder Guides)
Innes-Smith, Robert. The Dukeries & Sherwood Forest
Ottewell, David. Sherwood Forest in Old Photographs (Britain in Old Photographs)

External links

Forestry England
The News, History, and Archaeology of The Real Sherwood Forest
Nottinghamshire County Council's Official Sherwood Forest Page 
Sherwood Forest Regeneration Plans
Sherwood Forest Trust Official Website
The Living Legend details current plans for the forest.
Official tourism website for Nottinghamshire and Sherwood Forest
According to Ancient Custom: Research on the possible Origins and Purpose of Thynghowe Sherwood Forest

 
Country parks in Nottinghamshire
English royal forests
Forests and woodlands of Nottinghamshire
Nature reserves in Nottinghamshire
Protected areas established in 1969
Protected areas established in 2002
Protected areas established in 2007
Tourist attractions in Nottinghamshire
Edwinstowe